Wilfred Nixon (22 October 1882 – April 1985) was an English professional footballer who played in the Football League for Fulham as a goalkeeper.

Personal life 
Robson served with the Football Battalion of the Middlesex Regiment during the First World War. He was captured by the Germans in Oppy on 28 April 1917. He was the interred as a prisoner of war.

Career statistics

References

1882 births
1985 deaths
English footballers
Association football goalkeepers
Carlisle United F.C. players
Newburn F.C. players
Fulham F.C. players
English Football League players
Queens Park Rangers F.C. wartime guest players
Middlesex Regiment soldiers
British Army personnel of World War I
World War I prisoners of war held by Germany
British World War I prisoners of war
English centenarians
Men centenarians
Newcastle United F.C. players
Date of death missing
Place of death missing
Military personnel from Cumberland

Sportspeople from Workington
Footballers from Cumbria